Saxon Rovers are a South African football club based in Cape Town. They currently play in the amateur leagues.

External links
Saxon Rovers FC club page

References

Soccer clubs in Cape Town
Association football clubs established in 1944
National First Division clubs
1944 establishments in South Africa